Deepest Blue are a British electronic music duo comprising Matt Schwartz and Joel Edwards. They are best known for their UK Top 10 hit singles, "Deepest Blue" (2003) and "Give It Away" (2004).

History 
Deepest Blue consists of Joel Edwards and Matt Schwartz. Schwartz had worked with Arthur Baker, Mica Paris, JTQ and Massive Attack prior to Deepest Blue. He collaborated with Massive Attack on their album Mezzanine, helping to co-write "Dissolved Girl" which was used in the 1999 film The Matrix. After being signed to Warner Chappell, fellow producer and singer-songwriter Edwards went on to work with Ed Case, Planet Funk, Chicane, M Factor, Skin and Melanie C.

Deepest Blue's first single, "Deepest Blue", was released in 2003. It peaked at No. 7 in the UK Singles Chart, their highest chart entry. Their second single, "Give It Away", reached No. 9 in the UK chart in early 2004, and No. 2 in the airplay chart. Their third release, "Is It a Sin", reached the Top 30 in May 2004. Their fourth single, "Shooting Star" was released in August 2004 peaked at No. 57 in the UK chart. It was used as the backing music for Sky Sports News between 2004 and 2007. Deepest Blue's only album, Late September, reached No. 22 in the UK Albums Chart. The group sold 70,000 albums, earning them a silver disc.

After a break to work on alternative projects, Deepest Blue reformed in 2006. They released "Miracle" on Destined Records in 2008. The group split up in 2010.

On 20 May 2020, it was announced on the group's Facebook page that they had reformed with more information to follow. Prior to this announcement, a new version of "Give it Away" with Russian DJs, Filatov & Karas was released on 9 April 2020. On 1 January 2021, a brand new single "Bad Guy" (which samples "Deepest Blue") was released. On 5 July 2021, the group released their latest single, "Rage" with the official video premiering on 6 August 2021.

Discography

Studio albums

Singles

References

External links 

 Destined Records
Deepest Blue on Beatport.com

English house music duos
Deep house musicians